The Old Bank Formation is a geologic formation in Bocas del Toro Province, Panama. It preserves coral fossils dating back to the Messinian period.

Fossil content 
 Antillia coatesi
 Trachyphyllia mcneilli

See also 
 List of fossiliferous stratigraphic units in Panama

References

Bibliography

Further reading 
 J. S. Klaus, D. F. McNeill, A. F. Budd and A. G. Coates. 2012. Neogene reef coral assemblages of the Bocas del Toro region, Panama: the rise of Acropora palmata. Coral Reefs 31(1):191-203

Geologic formations of Panama
Neogene Panama
Messinian
Limestone formations
Reef deposits
Formations